Pomponio Creek is a  westward flowing stream in San Mateo County, California that originates on the western slope of the Santa Cruz Mountains and flows into the Pacific Ocean at Pomponio State Beach.

History
Pomponio Creek is named for Ponponio Lupugeyun (also known as José Pomponio Lupugeym), a resistance fighter against the California mission system who had a mountain hideout at the headwaters of Pomponio Creek.

Watershed and Course

Ecology
In 2004, the private, nonprofit Peninsula Open Space Trust (POST) purchased conservation easements on the Arata Ranch along Pomponio Creek to protect the watershed.

References

See also
List of watercourses in the San Francisco Bay Area

Rivers of San Mateo County, California
Rivers of Northern California